Sujangarh Assembly constituency is one of constituencies of Rajasthan Legislative Assembly in the Churu (Lok Sabha constituency). It has been reserved for Scheduled Castes.

Sujangarh Constituency covers all voters from parts of Sujangarh tehsil, which include ILRC Sujangarh including Sujangarh Municipal Board, ILRC Jeeli, ILRC Salasar, ILRC Bidasar including Bidasar Municipal Board, ILRC Lalgrah and ILRC Tendesar.

Member Of Legislative Assembly

Election Results

2021

2018

2013

See also 
 Member of the Legislative Assembly (India)

References

Churu district
Assembly constituencies of Rajasthan